Golden Power Group, or Golden Power Group Holdings Limited (HKEX: 8038), known as Golden Power, is established in 1972 in Hong Kong, previously named as Golden Power Industrial Limited. In January 2016, the total asset of this company reaches HKD 150 million.

Company History 

Golden Power Group is mainly based in Hong Kong and China, focusing on manufacturing, designing and selling diverse type of batteries for the use of electronic products (B to B) and retail sale (B to C).

This company was on list in HKEX on 28 May 1993, and was named as “Golden Power International Limited” (Before China Oil & Gas Group Company). In 2000, Hikari Tsushin Investments Management (HK) Limited acquired and place the company under trusteeship. Golden Power was on list again on Growth Enterprise Market on 5 June 2015 and issued 56 Million stock, with placing price around HKD1.25-1.35, raising a total of HKD 75.6 Million.

Main Business 

Golden Power mainly provides batteries and related products. The list of products is as below:
 Alkaline Battery
 Carbon Battery
 Alkaline button cell
 Silver Zinc Battery
 Lithium Battery
 Zinc–air battery
 Rechargeable Battery
 Charger

References

External links 
 www.goldenpower.com

Battery manufacturers
Consumer battery manufacturers
Manufacturing companies of Hong Kong
Electronics companies established in 1972
Companies listed on the Hong Kong Stock Exchange
Hong Kong brands
1972 establishments in Hong Kong